Vanlieu Corners (also Van Liew's Corners) is an unincorporated community in East Amwell Township in Hunterdon County, New Jersey, United States.

In 1881, the settlement consisted of a small cluster of residences, surrounding the Chamberlin & Van Liew store.  Vanlieu Corners was in the same school district as Wertsville. Today, the area is at the corner of Wertsville Road (County Route 602) and Rileyville Road (CR 607) and consists of mostly farmland on the north slope of the Sourland Mountain.

References

East Amwell Township, New Jersey
Unincorporated communities in Hunterdon County, New Jersey
Unincorporated communities in New Jersey